Growing Up Brady is a 2000 American made-for-television biographical film based on the 1992 autobiography Growing Up Brady: I Was a Teenage Greg written by actor Barry Williams with Chris Kreski. Directed by Richard A. Colla, it starred Williams, Adam Brody, Kaley Cuoco, Daniel Hugh Kelly and Michael Tucker, and was originally broadcast May 21, 2000 on NBC.

Synopsis
The movie is about the production of the 1969–1974 ABC sitcom The Brady Bunch, on which Williams played young Greg Brady, with backstage dramas among the cast and the show's producers. However at times some of the scenes have been slightly altered from what actually occurred in real life. The film is dedicated to the memory of Robert Reed.

Cast
 Barry Williams as Himself and Narrator
 Adam Brody as Barry Williams
 Kaley Cuoco as Maureen McCormick
 Daniel Hugh Kelly as Robert Reed
 Rebeccah Bush as Florence Henderson
 Michael Tucker as Sherwood Schwartz
 Michael Fetters as Lloyd J. Schwartz
 Ricky Ullman as Christopher Knight
 Kaitlin Cullum as Eve Plumb
 Scott Lookinland as Mike Lookinland, Scott is also Mike Lookinland's son
 Carly Schroeder as Susan Olsen
 Suanne Spoke as Ann B. Davis
 Barbara Mallory as Frances Whitfield
 Paul Greenberg as Davy Jones
 Marianne McAndrew as Doris Williams
 Sherwood Schwartz as Himself
 Mark Kassen as Eddie Fontaine
 Mike Lookinland as Camera Operator

Differences from the book
In his book, Williams writes that he first kissed McCormick in Hawaii, rather than in a limousine bringing them home from The Who concert in Los Angeles. The flirting between McCormick and Williams while filming for "A Room at the Top" (episode 95) happened a few months before the Hawaii episodes and was boosted for the TV movie. Although in the film Eve Plumb's character is unfazed when a security guard stumbles upon her and Christopher Knight making out in a prop car on the Paramount Pictures backlot, Knight has said Plumb was "mortified" and started to cry. Also a scene where Williams' agent tells him that The Brady Bunch had been canceled is changed somewhat. Instead of drinking a bottle of Bourbon, he is drinking a bottle of Scotch.

Home media
The film was released on DVD in region 1 by Paramount Home Media Distribution in May 2004.

In June 2019, the film was re-released on DVD by CBS/Paramount as a part of The Brady-est Brady Bunch TV & Movie Collection to commemorate the 50th anniversary of the original series.

References

External links
 

The Brady Bunch films
2000 television films
2000 films
2000s biographical films
American biographical films
Films based on television series
Films based on biographies
Films about actors
Biographical films about actors
Films directed by Richard A. Colla
NBC network original films
Paramount Pictures films
2000s American films